Nationality words link to articles with information on the nation's poetry or literature (for instance, Irish or France).

Events
 The Kenyon Review is restarted by Kenyon College in the United States 10 years after the original publication was closed.
 Jahrbuch der Lyrik ("Poetry Yearbook"), an annual poetry anthology, is launched in Germany, nine years before the similar series The Best American Poetry is begun. Each year's edition, containing 100 poems, is published in the spring by Beck, and is edited by Christoph Buchwald along with a guest editor.
 Poetry Canada Review founded by Clifton Whiten in order to publish and review poetry from across Canada; the publication folds in 1994.

Works published in English
Listed by nation where the work was first published and again by the poet's native land, if different; substantially revised works listed separately:

Australia
 Robert Adamson Where I Come From
 Robert Gray, Grass script
 Jennifer Maiden, The Border Loss, Angus & Robertson
 Les Murray, The Boys Who Stole the Funeral, Angus & Robertson, 1979, 1980 and Manchester, Carcanet, 1989
 John Tranter:
 Dazed in the Ladies Lounge, Island Press (Australia)
 Editor, The New Australian Poetry (anthology)
 Chris Wallace-Crabbe:
 The Emotions Are Not Skilled Workers, Sydney: Angus & Robertson
 Toil and Spin: Two Directions in Modern  Poetry (scholarship), Melbourne: Hutchinson

Canada
 Dionne Brand, Earth Magic
 Paul Dutton, Right Hemisphere, Left Ear
 Michael Ondaatje, There's a Trick with a Knife I'm Learning to Do
 Irving Layton, Droppings from Heaven. Toronto: McClelland and Stewart.
 Irving Layton, The Tamed Puma. Toronto: Virgo Press.
 Irving Layton, There Were No Signs. Toronto: Madison Gallery.
 Dennis Lee.The Gods. Toronto: McClelland and Stewart.
 Steven McCaffery and B.P. Nichol, In England Now That Spring
 Susan Musgrave, A Man to Bury, A Man to Marry
 Michael Ondaatje (also see "Anthologies in Canada" section below):
 There's a Trick with a Knife I'm Learning to Do: Poems, 1963-1978, New York: W. W. Norton (New York, NY), 1979 ,  (published as Rat Jelly, and Other Poems, 1963-1978, London, United Kingdom: Marion Boyars, 1980)
 Claude Glass (literary criticism), Toronto: Coach House Press
 Charles Sangster, Hesperus and other poems and lyrics (revised edition), edited by Frank M. Tierney (Tecumseh) 
 Raymond Souster, Hanging In: New Poems. Ottawa: Oberon Press.
 James Wreford Watson, Countryside Canada.<ref>"J(ames) Wreford Watson," Dictionary of Literary Biography, Bookrags. com,Web, Apr. 21, 2011.</ref>

Anthologies in Canada
 Michael Ondaatje:
 Editor, A Book of Beasts, animal verse; Ottawa: Oberon; revision of The Broken Ark, 1971
 Editor, The Long Poem Anthology, Toronto: Coach House 

India, in English
 K. R. Srinivasa Iyengar, Leaves from a Log: Fragments of a Journey, New Delhi: Arnold Heinemann
 Kamala Das, Old Playhouse and Other Poems ( Poetry in English ), Madras: Orient Longman
 Eunice de Souza, Fix ( Poetry in English ), Bombay: Newground, India.
 Jayanta Mahapatra, Waiting ( Poetry in English ), New Delhi: Samkaleen Prakashan
 Prabhu Siddartha Guptara, Continuations ( Poetry in English ), Calcutta: Writers Workshop
 Om Prakash Bhatnagar, Feeling FossilsIreland
 Harry Clifton, Office of the Salt Merchant, Oldcastle: The Gallery Press,  Ireland
 Seamus Heaney, Northern Ireland poet published in the United Kingdom:
 Field Work, Faber & Faber
 Hedge School, Janus Press
 Ugolino, Carpenter Press
 Gravities, Charlotte Press
 A Family Album, Byron Press
 Thomas Kinsella, One and Other Poems, including "Anniversaries"
 Michael Longley, The Echo Gate. Northern Ireland poet published in the United Kingdom
 Derek Mahon, Poems 1962-1978, including "A Dying Art", "Ecclesiastes", "An Image from Beckett", "Lives", "The Snow Party", "A Refusal to Mourn" and "A Disused Shed in Co. Wexford", Oxford University Press, Northern Ireland poet published in the United Kingdom

New Zealand
 Fleur Adcock (New Zealand poet who moved to England in 1963):
 The Inner Harbour, Oxford and New York: Oxford University Press (New Zealand poet who moved to England in 1963)
 Below Loughrigg, Newcastle upon Tyne: Bloodaxe Books 
 Allen Curnow, An Incorrigible Music Bill Manhire, Dawn/Water Bob Orr, Poems for MoiraAnthologies
 John Jessop, editor, International Anthology of Concrete Poetry, vol. i George Swede, editor, The Canadian Haiku AnthologySouth Africa
 Mazisi Kunene, Emperor Shaka the Great: a Zulu EpicUnited Kingdom
 Fleur Adcock (New Zealand poet who moved to England in 1963):
 The Inner Harbour, Oxford and New York: Oxford University Press (New Zealand poet who moved to England in 1963)
 Below Loughrigg, Newcastle upon Tyne: Bloodaxe Books 
 Kingsley Amis, Collected Poems 1944–1979 James Berry, Fractured Circles Anne Born, Changing Views Robert Conquest, Forays Patric Dickinson, Our Living John, and Other Poems Maureen Duffy, Memorials of the Quick and the Dead Douglas Dunn, Barbarians Ketaki Kushari Dyson, Hibiscus in the North D. J. Enright, A Faust Book John Fuller, Lies and Secrets W. S. Graham, Collected Poems 1942–1977 Thom Gunn, Selected Poems 1950–1975 (see also Poems 1969 in poetry, Collected Poems 1993)
 Seamus Heaney, Northern Ireland poet published in the United Kingdom:
 Field Work, Faber & Faber
 Hedge School, Janus Press
 Ugolino, Carpenter Press
 Gravities, Charlotte Press
 A Family Album, Byron Press
 Ted Hughes:
 Moortown Remains of Elmet Elizabeth Jennings, Moments of Grace P. J. Kavanagh, Life Before Death Omar Khayyám, The Rubaiyat, translated by John Heath-Stubbs and Peter Avery
 Michael Longley, The Echo Gate Roger McGough, Holiday on Death Row Derek Mahon, Poems 1962-1978. Oxford University Press
 Pete Morgan, The Spring Collection Brian Patten, Grave Gossip Craig Raine, A Martian Sends a Postcard Home Peter Reading, FictionUnited States
 John Ashbery, As We Know Ted Berrigan and Harris Schiff, Yo-Yo's With Money Joseph Payne Brennan, Webs of Time (Macabre House)
 Maxine Chernoff, Utopia TV Store (The Yellow Press)
 Robert Creeley, Was That a Real Poem and Other Essays, edited by Donald Allen (Bolinas, California), criticism
 Federico García Lorca (posthumous), translated by Paul Blackburn, Lorca/Blackburn: Poems of Federico García Lorca Chosen by Paul Blackburn John Hollander, Blue Wine Paul Hoover, Letter to Einstein Beginning Dear Albert (The Yellow Press)
 Stanley Kunitz, The Poems of Stanley Kunitz Denise Levertov, Collected Earlier Poems Gary Miranda, Listeners at the Breathing Place F. A. Nettelbeck, Bug Death Mary Oliver, Sleeping in the Forest (chapbook)
 George Quasha, Giving the Lily Back Her Hands (Station Hill Press)
 Frank Stanford, You, posthumous chapbook (Lost Roads Publishers)
 Robert Penn Warren, Brother to DragonsWorks published in other languages
Listed by language and often by nation where the work was first published and again by the poet's native land, if different; substantially revised works listed separately:

Denmark
 Inger Christensen, Brev i April ("Letter in April")
 Klaus Høeck, Denmark:
 Dylan Forever, publisher: Swing
 Winterreise, publisher: Gyldendal 
 Henrik Nordbrandt, SpøgelseslegeFrench
Canada, in French
 Jean Royer, Les heures nues, Montréal: Nouvelles Éditions de l'Arc
 Marie Uguay Signe et rumeurFrance
 Noureddine Aba, Gazelle après minuit, Algerian writer
 Alain Bosquet, Poémes, un, his collected works up to 1967
 André du Bouchet, Laisses Pierre Emmanuel, Una, ou la mort, la vie Claude Esteban, Terres, travaux du cœur, Flammarion
 Guillevic, Etier André Pieyre de Mandiargues, L'ivre Oeil Patrick Reumaux, Repérages du vifIndia
Listed in alphabetical order by first name:
 Ajmer Rode, Surti, London, Ontario: Third Eye Publications,   Chandigarh: Raghbir Rachna Parkashan; Punjabi-language
 Geeta Parikh, Bhinash; Gujarati-language
 K. Satchidanandan, Ezhuthachan Ezhutumbol, ("When the Poet Writes"); Malayalam-language
 Kunwar Narain, Apne Samne, New Delhi: Rajkamal Prakashan; Hindi-language
 Malika Amar Sheikh, Valuchya Priyakar, Mumbai: Dr Babasaheb Ambedkar Prabodhini; Marathi-language
 Rajendra Bhandari, Hiundey yee chisa raatka pardeharuma ("In the Veils of Cold Wintry Nights"), Gangtok, Sikkim: Padmakala Prakashan; Nepali-language

Poland
 Stanisław Barańczak, Etyka i poetyka ("Ethics and Poetics"), criticism; Paris: Instytut Literacki
 Ewa Lipska:
 Dom spokojnej młodości ("A Home for Youth"), selected poems, Kraków: Wydawnictwo literackie
 Zywa smierc, ("Living Death"); Kraków: Wydawnictwo literackie

Spain
 Matilde Camus, Corcel en el tiempo ("Steed of the time")

Other
 Christoph Buchwald, general editor, and Harald Hartung, guest editor, Jahrbuch der Lyrik 1: Am Rand der Zeit ("Poetry Yearbook 1: On the Edge of Time"), publisher: Claassen; anthology; Germany
 Haim Gouri, Ayuma, Israeli writing in Hebrew
 Nizar Qabbani, I Testify That There Is No Woman But You, Syrian poet writing in Arabic

Awards and honors
 Nobel Prize in Literature: Odysseus Elytis, Greek

Canada
 See 1979 Governor General's Awards for a complete list of winners and finalists for those awards.
 Prix Émile-Nelligan: François Charron, BlessuresUnited Kingdom
 Cholmondeley Award: Alan Brownjohn, Andrew Motion, Charles Tomlinson
 Eric Gregory Award: Stuart Henson, Michael Jenkins, Alan Hollinghurst, Sean O'Brien, Peter Thabit Jones, James Lindesay, Walter Perrie, Brian Moses

United States
 AML Award for Poetry to Marden J. Clark for "Moods: Of Late" and Edward L. Hart for "To Utah"
 Bollingen Prize:  W.S. Merwin
 American Academy of Arts and Letters Gold Medal in Poetry, Archibald MacLeish
 Pulitzer Prize for Poetry: Robert Penn Warren: Now and Then Walt Whitman Award: David Bottoms, Shooting Rats at the Bibb County Dump Fellowship of the Academy of American Poets: May Swenson and Mark Strand

Births
 February 4 - Ben Lerner, American poet, novelist and critic
 October 16 - Jonathan Edwards, Welsh, English-language poet
 Aifric Mac Aodha, Irish-language poet and editor
 Qabaniso Malewezi ('Q'), Malawian musician and English-language poet

Deaths
Birth years link to the corresponding "[year] in poetry" article:
 February 8 - Alexandru A. Philippide (born 1900), Romanian
 February 9 - Allen Tate (born 1899), American poet, of emphysema
 June 15 - Ernst Meister (born 1911), German
 July 15 - Juana de Ibarbourou (born 1892), Uruguayan
 September 5 - John Bradburne (born 1921), English poet and missionary, killed by guerillas
 September 7 - I. A. Richards (born 1893), influential English literary critic and rhetorician
 October 6 - Elizabeth Bishop (born 1911), American poet, from an aneurism
 December 7 - Nicolas Born (born 1937), German poet, from cancer

Notes

 Britannica Book of the Year 1980 ("for events of 1979"), published by Encyclopædia Britannica'' 1980 (source of many items in "Works published" section and rarely in other sections)

See also

 Poetry
 List of poetry awards
 List of years in poetry

20th-century poetry
Poetry